Relatives can refer to:

 Kinship
 Relatives (1985 film), a 1985 Australian movie
 Relatives (2006 film), a 2006 Hungarian movie
 "Relatives", a song by Irving Berlin

See also
 Relative (disambiguation)